Myint Thein is a Burmese politician who currently serves as a Pyithu Hluttaw MP for Wetlet Township.

Political career
He is a member of the National League for Democracy. In 2015 Myanmar general election and 2020 Myanmar general election, he was elected as a Pyithu Hluttaw MP and elected representative from  Wetlet Township parliamentary constituency.

References

Living people
1960 births
People from Sagaing Region